Qatar-3 is a faint 12th magnitude star located in the northern constellation Andromeda. It is host to a transiting planet. With a radial velocity of 10.99 km/s, it is currently drifting away from the Solar System, and is currently located 2,400 light years away based on parallax.

Properties 
This star is a hot yellow dwarf with 14.5% more mass than the Sun, and 27.2% larger. It has a luminosity of almost two times that of the Sun, and has effective temperature of 5,991 K, which gives it a yellow hue. Qatar-3 is also a metal poor star that has a similar metallicity to the Sun, and has a rapid rotation rate of 10.4 km/s. This means it takes Qatar-3 6.31 days to complete a full rotation, while the Sun takes almost a month to rotate.

Planetary System 

In 2016, the Qatar Exoplanet Survey discovered a planet around Qatar-3, Qatar-4, and Qatar-5, which was led by an international team in Qatar. Qatar-3b is a massive planet, with 4.31 times the mass of Jupiter, and has a similar radius to the latter.

Qatar-3b 
Qatar-3b is a hot Jupiter.  It orbits its star every 2.5 days.  It was discovered in 2016 by the Qatar Exoplanet Survey(QES).  This planet was discovered by QES along with Qatar-4b and Qatar-5b.  The light curves of the planet's respective host stars have been observed as well during the survey, along with their stellar properties
Orbit
This planet is another typical hot Jupiter. It orbits very close to its star with a period of 2 days, 12 hours, 11 minutes, and 24 seconds. This corresponds with an orbital distance of about 0.04 AU, which is 10 times closer to its star than Mercury is to the Sun. With an eccentricity of 0, this suggests that Qatar-3b is on a perfectly circular orbit.

Physical properties
Qatar-3b is a massive planet, with 4.31 times the mass of Jupiter, but a similar radius.  With a density if 4.0 g cm−3, this is one of the densest planets discovered. With an effective temperature of 1,681 K, it is a scorched planet.

References 

G-type main-sequence stars
Andromeda (constellation)